Euphorbia decidua is a plant of the family Euphorbiaceae. It was described by Peter René Oscar Bally & Leslie Charles Leach in 1975. Its habitats are Zimbabwe, Zambia, Malawi and Zaire.

The flowers are pale green with a red centre.

References

decidua